The Second Sangam period or Middle Sangam Period (Tamil: இடை சங்கம்) (Malayalam: ഇടക്കാല സംഘം), or the Second Academy, was a legendary period in the history of Ancient Tamil land said to be the foremost of Tamil Sangams, known in the Tamil language as கூடல் (kooṭal). It was the second of the three Tamil Sangams of Classical Tamil literature.

Historicity
The primary factors leading to the formation of the Middle Sangam period was mentioned in the Iraiyanar Kalaviyal which mentions the kingdom of a King named Kandungon who was the last ruler during the First Sangam. It was washed away in a sea-erosion. This led to the Second Sangam period.

Formation
The second Sangam was convened in Kapatapuram.  This Sangam lasted for 3700 years and had 59 members, with 1700 poets participating. There were 59 Pandiya kings starting from Vendercceliyan to Mudattirumaran were decedents and rulers of that period. This city was also submerged in sea. Ramayana and Arthashastra of Kautalya corroborates the existence of a city named Kavatapuram. There is a reference to a South Indian place called Kavata by Sugriva in a verse which runs something like 'having reached Kavata suitable for Pandiya'. Kavata is also mentioned by Kautalya in Arthashastra. The grammar followed was Budapuranam, Agattiyam, Tholkappiyam, Mapuranam and Isai Nunukkam. The poems attributed to second academy are Kali, Kurugu, Vendali and Viyalamalai Ahaval. The Third Sangam (kaṭaicaṅkam) was purportedly located in the current city of Madurai and lasted for 1850 years. There were 49 Pandiya kings starting from Mudattirumaran (who came away from Kabadapuram to present Madurai) to Ukkirapperu valudi were descendants and rulers of that period. The academy had 49 members, and 449 poets are described as having participated in the Sangam. The grammars followed were Agattiyam and Tholkappiyam. The poems composed were Kurunthogai, Netunthogai, Kurunthogai Nanooru, Narrinai Nanooru, Purananooru, Aingurunooru, Padirrupaatu, Kali, Paripaadal, Kuttu, Vari, Sirrisai and Perisai.

There are a number of other isolated references to the legend of academies at Madurai scattered through Shaivite and Vaishnavite devotional literature throughout later literature.

See also 
 Tamil Sangams
 Madurai Tamil Sangam

References

Tamil-language literature
Cultural history of Tamil Nadu
Ancient Tamil Nadu
Tamil history